The 2006–2007 Úrvalsdeild kvenna was the 49th season of the Úrvalsdeild kvenna, the top-tier women's basketball league in Iceland. The season started on October 21, 2006 and ended on April 14, 2007. Haukar won its first title by defeating Keflavík 3–1 in the Finals.

Competition format
The participating teams first played a conventional round-robin schedule with every team playing each opponent twice "home" and twice "away" for a total of 20 games. The top four teams qualified for the championship playoffs whilst the bottom team was relegated to Division I.

Regular season

Playoffs

Source: 2007 Iceland Express deildin playoffs

References

External links
Official Icelandic Basketball Federation website

Icelandic
Úrvalsdeild kvenna seasons (basketball)